The Edson station is a Via Rail station in Edson, Alberta, Canada. It is on the Canadian National Railway and serves Via Rail's The Canadian as a flag stop (48 hours advance notice required).

Footnotes

External links 
Via Rail Station Description

Edson, Alberta
Via Rail stations in Alberta
Canadian National Railway stations in Alberta